Nethania Irawan (born 4 February 2004) is an Indonesian badminton player.

Achievements

BWF International Challenge/Series (1 title) 
Women's doubles

  BWF International Challenge tournament
  BWF International Series tournament
  BWF Future Series tournament

References

External links 
 

2004 births
Living people
People from Surabaya
Indonesian female badminton players
21st-century Indonesian women